Snort may refer to:
 Nose-blowing
 Sniffle
 Nasal administration, the inhaling of drugs through the nose
 Snort (software), a package for intrusion detection
 Snort, a map-coloring game
 Insufflation, the act of blowing, breathing, hissing, or puffing
 Insufflation (medicine)
 Snort, a common military name for a submarine snorkel
 The name of a power shovel in Are You My Mother?
 Dale Snodgrass, United States Naval Aviator and air show performer whose Naval callsign was "Snort"